Bascom is a light rail station operated by Santa Clara Valley Transportation Authority (VTA).  The station has a single center platform between two tracks. Bascom station is served by the Green Line of the VTA Light Rail system.

Location
Bascom station is located along the Southwest Expressway near the intersection of Bascom Avenue, after which the station was named. The Los Gatos Creek Trail trailhead is located about a block away from the station.

History
Bascom station was built as part of the Vasona Light Rail extension project.  This project extended VTA light rail service from the intersection of Woz Way and West San Carlos St in San Jose in a southwesterly direction to the Winchester station in western Campbell.

The official opening date for this station was October 1, 2005.

The construction of this station and the rest of the Vasona Light Rail extension was part of the 1996 Measure B Transportation Improvement Program.  Santa Clara County voters approved the Measure B project in 1996 along with a one half percent sales tax increase.  The Vasona Light Rail extension was funded mostly by the resulting sales tax revenues with additional money coming from federal and state funding, grants, VTA bond revenues, and municipal contributions.

Screens

San Jose artist Diana Pumpelly Bates has created metal screens for the shelters that provide visual interest for passengers at the stations as well as for motorists and pedestrians passing by the stations.   The patterns are a reminder of woven baskets created by the valley's early inhabitants.

Service

Station layout

References

Santa Clara Valley Transportation Authority light rail stations
Santa Clara Valley Transportation Authority bus stations
Railway stations in San Jose, California
Railway stations in the United States opened in 2005
2005 establishments in California